The Fair Representation Act (H.R. 3863) is a bill filed in the United States House of Representatives. Originally introduced in 2017 during the 115th Congress by Don Beyer (D–VA), it was reintroduced by Beyer in 2019 and 2021.

The bill has three main provisions:
 Establish independent redistricting commissions in all states to prevent gerrymandering
 Creating multi-member districts for elections to the House of Representatives, with each district having at least 3 members
 Require the use of ranked choice voting, in particular single transferable vote, to elect members to the House

Purpose 
Beyer has stated the goal of the bill is to reduce polarization and partisanship by incentivizing elected representatives to appeal to a broader range of voters. Ranked choice voting and multi-seat districts would reduce the number of safe-seat districts and encourage more political competition as competition to the two-party system.  

The act is also alleged to ensure more proportional representation, both with political parties but also with the election of more women and minority candidates.

Reactions

Support 
The bill has been supported by FairVote.

Legislative history

See Also 
 Single transferable vote
Proportional representation
Electoral reform in the United States
 Ranked-choice voting in the United States
 For The People Act

References 

Proposed legislation of the 115th United States Congress
Proposed legislation of the 116th United States Congress
Proposed legislation of the 117th United States Congress
Gerrymandering in the United States
Single transferable vote
Electoral reform in the United States